Thomas Mure Hart, CMG (1 March 1909 – 16 January 2001) was a Scottish cricketer and rugby union player. He played twice for the Scotland national rugby union team and twice for the Scotland national cricket team as a right-handed batsman and right-arm fast-medium bowler.  Hart served as the Financial Secretary to Singapore between 1954 and 1959.

Biography

Born in Glasgow in 1909, Hart was educated at Glasgow Academy, Strathallan School, Glasgow University and Brasenose College, Oxford. In 1930, he played twice for Scotland in the Five Nations against Wales and Ireland at centre. Scotland beating Wales 12–9 at Murrayfield on 1 February and losing 14–11 to Ireland at Murrayfield on 22 February.  In 1931 he played two games for Leicester Tigers.

Whilst attending Oxford University, Hart played for the university cricket team, playing ten first-class matches in 1931 and 1932, gaining his blue in both years.  He made his debut for Scotland in 1933, playing against Ireland. He played a second match against Australia the following year. Both matches were first-class.

Hart entered the Colonial Service in 1933 and was seconded to the Colonial Office between 1933 and 1936.  He joined the Malayan Civil Service in 1936.  Hart played two matches for the Malaya cricket team, drawing with Sir Julien Cahn's XI in 1937 and losing to the Ceylonese cricket team in 1938.  He also played three matches for the Federated Malay States against the Straits Settlements between 1937 and 1939. During the Second World War he was captured in Malaya and served as a civilian detainee.

In 1953 he was appointed Director of Commerce and Industry in Singapore and in 1954 he was appointed the Financial Secretary to Singapore.

Awards

Appointed a Companion of St Michael and St George, 1957.

See also

 List of Scottish cricket and rugby union players
 1930 Five Nations Championship

Further reading
 Bath, Richard (ed.) The Scotland Rugby Miscellany (Vision Sports Publishing Ltd, 2007 )
 Godwin, Terry Complete Who's Who of International Rugby (Cassell, 1987)

References

1909 births
2001 deaths
Cricketers from Glasgow
Federated Malay States cricketers
Scottish cricketers
Oxford University cricketers
Oxford University RFC players
Scottish rugby union players
Scotland international rugby union players
People educated at Strathallan School
Alumni of the University of Glasgow
Alumni of Brasenose College, Oxford
World War II prisoners of war held by Japan
Malaysian rugby union players
Companions of the Order of St Michael and St George
Rugby union players from Glasgow
British colonial governors and administrators in Asia
Leicester Tigers players